George Rae (born 1901) was an Australian architect. He designed some of Brisbane's best interwar apartment buildings. A number of his works are listed on the Queensland Heritage Register.

Early life
George Rae was born on 8 March 1901 in at 20 Avon Street, Glasgow, Scotland, son of Alexander Don Renwick Rae and his wife Agnes McLean McPherson.

Career
From 1927 to 1931, George Rae worked for Atkinson, Powell and Conrad. From 1931 to 1933, he was in partnership with Lange Leopold Powell.

In his early thirties and one of Brisbane's most successful young architects, Rae had established his own architectural practice in Brisbane in 1933. Rae designed a variety of buildings, including new forms of architectural construction to Brisbane such as picture theatres and residential flats. His more substantial purpose-designed flat buildings are amongst the most important of their type and their period in Brisbane.

Works
His works include:
 Gympie and Widgee War Memorial Gates erected in 1920
 Toowong Soldiers' Memorial erected 
 Carrington (corner of Warry Street and Gregory Terrace, Spring Hill) erected in 1933
 Highview (on Dornoch Terrace, Highgate Hill) designed in 1933-34
 Casa del Mar (44 Moray Street, New Farm) erected in 1934
 Greystaines (240 Kingsford Smith Drive, Hamilton) constructed in 1934
 Green Gables (one of the Julius Street Flats) (corner of Julius and Moray streets, New Farm) erected in 1935.
 Cinema Taj, Abadan, Iran opened in 1944.

 Cinema Regent, Murwillumbah, New South Wales, Australia opened in 1947.

 Oceanic motel, Kirra Beach, Queensland opened in 1959

References

Attribution 

Architects from Brisbane
1901 births
Year of death missing
Articles incorporating text from the Queensland Heritage Register
British emigrants to Australia